Health literacy is the ability to obtain, read, understand, and use healthcare information in order to make appropriate health decisions and follow instructions for treatment. There are multiple definitions of health literacy, in part, because health literacy involves both the context (or setting) in which health literacy demands are made (e.g., health care, media, internet or fitness facility) and the skills that people bring to that situation.

Since health literacy is a primary contributing factor to health disparities, it is a continued and increasing concern for health professionals. The 2003 National Assessment of Adult Literacy (NAAL) conducted by the US Department of Education found that 36% of participants scored as either "basic" or "below basic" in terms of their health literacy and concluded that approximately 80 million Americans have limited health literacy. These individuals have difficulty with common health tasks including reading the label of a prescribed drug. Several factors may influence health literacy. However, the following factors have been shown to strongly increase this risk: age (especially patients 65 years and older), limited English language proficiency or English as a second language, chronic conditions, less education, and lower socioeconomic status. Patients with low health literacy understand less about their medical conditions and treatments and overall report worse health status.

Various interventions, such as simplifying information and illustrations, avoiding jargon, using "teach-back" methods, and encouraging patients' questions, have improved health behaviors in persons with low health literacy. The proportion of adults aged 18 and over in the U.S., in the year 2010, who reported that their health care providers always explained things so they could understand them was about 60.6%. This number increased 1% from 2007 to 2010. The Healthy People 2020 initiative of the United States Department of Health and Human Services (HHS) has included health literacy as a pressing new topic, with objectives for improving it in the decade to come.

In planning for Healthy People 2030 (the fifth edition of Healthy People), HHS issued a "Solicitation for Written Comments on an Updated Health Literacy Definition for Healthy People." Several proposals address the fact that "health literacy is multidimensional", being the result of a concerted effort that involves the individual seeking care or information, providers and caregivers, the complexity and demands of the system, and the use of plain language for communication.

Characteristics

Plain language 
Plain Language refers to the use of writing strategies that help readers find, understand, and apply information to fulfill their needs. It has a vital role to play in improving health literacy. In conjunction with readers education, provider cultural training, and system design, plain language helps people make more informed health choices.

Plain language is not, however, a one-size-fits-all approach. Some strategies can be used to improve communication among medical professionals, while others will improve communication with patients and caregivers. It is in this area of provider-patient communication that health literacy efforts have been strongest. Patients and consumers in general need to understand concepts that professionals often refer to in technical terms. Health professionals must know their audience in order to better serve their patients and general readers or listeners.

Plain language is defined by the International Plain Language Federation as writing whose "wording, structure, and design are so clear that the intended readers can easily find what they need, understand what they find, and use that information."

Some key elements of plain language include: 
 Organizing information so most important points come first
 Breaking complex information into understandable chunks
 Using simple language or language familiar to the reader
 Defining technical terms and acronyms 
 Using active voice in subject-verb-object (SVO ) sentences when subject/agent/topic coincide
 Varying sentence length and structure to avoid monotony
 Using lists and tables to make complex material easier to understand

The National Institute of Health (NIH) recommends that patient education materials be written at a 6th–7th grade reading level; further recommendations provided by the NIH Office of Communications and Public Liaison are published in their "Clear Communication" Initiative. The UK's National Institute for Health and Care Research (NIHR) recommends involving patients and non-academic members of the public in writing plain language summaries of research articles.

Factors that contribute to health literacy 
Many factors determine the health literacy level of health education materials or interventions: readability of the text, the patient's current state of health, language barriers between the clinician and patient, cultural appropriateness of the materials, format and style, sentence structure, use of illustrations, and numerous other factors.

A study of 69,000 patients conducted in 1995 by two US hospitals found that between 26% and 60% of patients could not understand medication directions, a standard informed consent form, or materials about scheduling an appointment. The 2003 National Assessment of Adult Literacy (NAAL) conducted by the US Department of Education found that 36% of participants scored as either "basic" or "below basic" in terms of their health literacy and  concluded that approximately 80 million Americans have limited health literacy.

Results of a systematic review of the literature found that when limited English proficient (LEP) patients receive care from physicians who are fluent in the patients' preferred language, referred to as having language concordance, generally improves outcomes. These outcomes are consistent across patient-reported measures, such as patient satisfaction, and also more such as blood pressure for patients with diabetes.

Standardized measures of health literacy are the Newest Vital Sign (NVS), which asks people about a nutrition label, and the Test of Functional Health Literacy (TOFHLA), which asks test-takers to fill in 36 blanks in patient instructions for X-rays and a Medicaid application, from multiple choices, and 4 numbers in medicine dosage forms.

History
The young and multidisciplinary field of health literacy emerged from two groups of experts: physicians, health providers such as nurses and health educators; and Adult Basic Education (ABE) and English as a second language (ESL) practitioners in the field of education. Physicians and nurses are a source of patient comprehension and compliance studies. Adult Basic Education / English for Speakers of Languages Other Than English (ABE/ESOL) specialists study and design interventions to help people develop reading, writing, and conversation skills and increasingly infuse curricula with health information to promote better health literacy. A range of approaches to adult education brings health literacy skills to people in traditional classroom settings, as well as where they work and live.

Biomedical approach
The biomedical approach to health literacy that became dominant (in the U.S.) during the 1980s and 1990s often depicted individuals as lacking health literacy or "suffering" from low health literacy. This approach assumed that recipients are passive in their possession and reception of health literacy and believed that models of literacy and health literacy are politically neutral and universally applicable. This approach is found lacking when placed in the context of broader ecological, critical, and cultural approaches to health. This approach has produced, and continues to reproduce, numerous correlational studies.

Level of health literacy is considered adequate when the population has sufficient knowledge, skills, and confidence to guide their own health, and people are able to stay healthy, recover from illness, and/or live with disability or disease.

McMurray states that health literacy ist important in a community because it addresses health inequities. It is no coincidence that individuals with lower levels of health literacy live, disproportionately, in communities with lower socio-economic standing. A barrier to achieving adequate health literacy for these individuals is a lack of awareness, or understanding of, information and resources relevant to improving their health. This knowledge gap arises from both patients being unable to understand information presented to them and hospitals' inadequate efforts and materials to address these literacy gaps.

A more robust view of health literacy includes the ability to understand scientific concepts, content, and health research; skills in spoken, written, and online communication; critical interpretation of mass media messages; navigating complex systems of health care and governance; knowledge and use of community capital and resources; and using cultural and indigenous knowledge in health decision making.  This integrative view sees health literacy as a social determinant of health that offers a powerful opportunity to reduce inequities in health.

This perspective defines health literacy as the wide range of skills, and competencies that people develop over their lifetimes to seek out, comprehend, evaluate, and use health information and concepts to make informed choices, reduce health risks, and increase quality of life. While various definitions vary in wording, they all fall within this conceptual framework.

Defining health literacy in that manner builds the foundation for a multi-dimensional model of health literacy built around four central domains:

fundamental literacy,
scientific literacy,
civic literacy, and
cultural literacy.

The cited paper by Zarcadoolas et al. focussed on "the public discourse about terrorism and bioterrorism that dominated the mass media during the anthrax threat in the United States during 2001." 

There are several tests, which have verified reliability in the academic literature that can be administered in order to test one's health literacy. Some of these tests include the Medical Term Recognition Test (METER), which was developed in the United States (2 minute administration time) for the clinical setting. The METER includes many words from the Rapid Estimate of Adult Literacy in Medicine (REALM) test. The Short Assessment of Health Literacy in Spanish and English populations (SAHL-S&E) uses word recognition and multiple choice questions to test a person's comprehension. The CHC-Test measures Critical Health Competencies and consists of 72 items designed to test a person's understanding of medical concepts, literature searching, basic statistics, and design of experiments and samples.

Patient safety and outcomes
According to an Institute of Medicine (2004) report, low health literacy negatively affects the treatment outcome and safety of care delivery. The lack of health literacy affects all segments of the population.  However, it is disproportionate in certain demographic groups, such as the elderly, ethnic minorities, recent immigrants,  individuals facing homelessness, and persons with low general literacy. These populations have a higher risk of hospitalization, longer hospital stays, are less likely to comply with treatment, are more likely to make errors with medication, and are more ill when they initially seek medical care.

The mismatch between a clinician's communication of content and a patient's ability to understand that content can lead to medication errors and adverse medical outcomes. Health literacy skills are not only a problem in the general population. Health care professionals (doctors, nurses, public health workers) can also have poor health literacy skills, such as a reduced ability to clearly explain health issues to patients and the public.
In addition to tailoring the content of what health professionals communicate to their patients, a well arranged layout, pertinent illustrations, and intuitive format of written materials can improve the usability of health care literature. This in turn can help in effective communication between healthcare providers and their patients.

Outcomes of low levels of health literacy also include relative expenditures on health services. Because individuals with low health literacy are more likely to have adverse health statuses, their use of health services is also increased. This trend is compounded by other risk factors of low health literacy, including poverty. Homelessness and housing insecurity can hinder good health and recovery in attempts to better health circumstances, causing the exacerbation of poor health conditions. In these cases, a variety of health services may be used repeatedly as health issues are prolonged. Thus overall expenditures on health services is greater among populations with low health literacy and poor health. These costs may be left to individuals and families to pay which may further burden health conditions, or the costs may be left to a variety of institutions which in turn has broader implications for government funding and health care systems.

A review of studies that focused on health literacy and its associated costs concluded that low levels of health literacy is responsible for 3–5% of healthcare cost—approximately $143 to 7,798 per individual within the healthcare system. For example, studies have shown that the increased prevalence of poor health and low health literacy has resulted in a greater use of emergency services by homeless individuals. A study conducted in San Francisco showed that "72% of the total cost of emergency services may be attributed to the top 13% of homeless users". In this way, low health literacy produces financial outcomes as well as those of health.

Risk identification
Identifying a patient as having low health literacy is essential for a healthcare professional to conform their health intervention in a way that the patient will understand. When patients with low health literacy receive care that is tailored to their more limited medical knowledge base, results have shown that health behaviors drastically improve. This has been seen with: correct medication use and dosage, utilizing health screenings, as well as increased exercise and smoking cessation. Effective visual aids have shown to help supplement the information communicated by the doctor in the office. In particular, easily readable brochures and videos have shown to be very effective. Healthcare professionals can use many methods to attain patients' health literacy. A multitude of tests used during research studies and three minute assessments commonly used in doctors offices are examples of the variety of tests healthcare professionals can use to better understand their patients' health literacy.

The American Medical Association showed that asking simple single-item questions, such as "How confident are you in filling out medical forms by yourself?", is a very effective and direct way to understand from a patient's point of view how they feel about interacting with their healthcare provider and understanding their health condition.

Homelessness 
Individuals facing homelessness constitute a population that holds intersectional identities, is highly mobile, and is often out of the public eye. Thus the difficulty of conducting research on this group has resulted in little information regarding homelessness as a condition that has increased risk of low health literacy levels among individuals. Nonetheless, studies that do exist indicate that homeless individuals experience increased prevalence of low health literacy and poor health—both physical and mental—due to vulnerabilities brought on by the insecurity of basic needs among homeless individuals. The combination of poor health and homelessness has been found to increase the risk for further decline in health status and increased housing insecurity, all of which is highly affected—and in many cases perpetuated—by low levels of health literacy.

Intervention
In order to be understood by patients with insufficient health literacy, health professionals must intervene to provide clear and concise information that can be more easily understood. Avoidance of medical jargon, illustrations of important concepts, and confirming information by a "teach back" method have shown to be effective tools to communicating essential health topics with health illiterate patients. A program called "Ask Me 3" is designed to bring public and physician attention to this issue, by letting patients know that they should ask three questions each time they talk to a doctor, nurse, or pharmacist:
What is my main problem?
What do I need to do?
Why is it important for me to do this?

There have also been large-scale efforts to improve health literacy. For example, a public information program by the US Department of Health and Human Services encourages patients to improve healthcare quality and avoid errors by asking questions about health conditions and treatment. Additionally, the IROHLA (Intervention Research on Health Literacy of the Ageing population)  project, funded by the European Union (EU), seeks to develop evidence-based guidelines for policy and practice to improve health literacy of the ageing population in EU member states. The project has developed a framework and identified and validated interventions which together constitute a comprehensive approach of addressing health literacy needs of the elderly.  The UK's National Institute for Health and Care Research (NIHR) has published review of research on health literacy, focusing on how to help people understand health information, and which groups of the population may need extra support. It covers research on using plain language, finding the focus, online information, and using alternative formats (e.g. visuals).

Health illiterate-related diabetes prevalence in Vietnamese-American populations
Diabetes is a rapidly growing health problem among immigrants—affecting approximately 10 percent of Asian-Americans.  It is the fifth-leading cause of death in Asian-Americans between the ages of 45 and 64.  In addition, type 2 diabetes is the most common form of the disease.  Those who are diagnosed with type 2 diabetes have high levels of blood glucose because the body does not effectively respond to insulin.  It is a lifelong disease with no known cure.  Diabetes is a chronic, debilitating, and costly social burden—costing healthcare systems about $100 billion annually.

Diabetes disproportionately affects underserved and ethnically diverse populations, such as Vietnamese-American communities.  The relationship between the disease and health literacy level is in part because of an individual's ability to read English, evaluate blood glucose levels, and communicate with medical professionals.  Other studies also suggest lack in knowledge of diabetes symptoms and complications.  According to an observational cross-sectional study conducted, many Vietnamese-American diabetic patients show signs of poor blood glucose control and adherence due to inadequate self-management knowledge and experience.  Diabetes health literacy research is needed to fully understand the burden of the chronic disease in Vietnamese-American communities, with respect to language and culture, health literacy, and immigrant status.  Ethnic minority groups and immigrant communities have less knowledge of health promoting behavior, face considerable obstacles to health services, and experience poor communication with medical professionals.  According to a recent review, studies have supported an independent relationship between literacy and knowledge of diabetes management and glucose control, but its impact on patients has not been sufficiently described.  With the demand of chronic disease self-management (e.g., diabetic diet, glucose monitoring, etc.), a call for cultural-specific patient education is needed to achieve the control of diabetes and its adverse health outcomes in low- to middle-income Vietnamese-American immigrant communities.

Oral health literacy in school teachers of Mangalore, India 
The problem of low oral health literacy (OHL) is often neglected which may lead to poor oral health outcomes and under utilization of oral care services. A cross-sectional survey of school teachers working in schools in Mangalore, India, was undertaken. Details regarding demographics, medical, and dental history, oral hygiene practices and habits, diet history, and decay promoting the potential of school teachers were obtained using face-to-face interview method. The Rapid Estimate of Adult Literacy in Dentistry-99 (REALD-99) was used to assess their OHL. The OHL was high in the school teachers with the REALD-99 scores ranging from 45 to 95 with a mean score of 75.83 ± 9.94. Th This study found that there was a statistically significant difference between OHL and education, frequency of brushing and the filled teeth. Although this study indicated high OHL levels among school teachers in Mangalore, India, the magnitude of dental caries in this population was also relatively high and very few had a healthy periodontium.

eHealth literacy
eHealth literacy describes an individual's ability to search for, access, comprehend, and appraise desired health information from electronic sources and to then use such information to attempt to address a particular health problem.  It has become an important topic of research due to the increasing use of the internet for health information seeking and health information distribution.  Stellefson (2011) states, "8 out of 10 Internet users report that they have at least once looked online for health information, making it the third most popular Web activity next to checking email and using search engines in terms of activities that almost everybody has done."  Though in recent years, individuals may have gained access to a multitude of health information via the Internet, access alone does not ensure that proper search skills and techniques are being used to find the most relevant online and electronic resources. As the line between a reputable medical source and an amateur opinion can often be blurred, the ability to differentiate between the two is important.

Health literacy requires a combination of several different literacy skills in order to facilitate eHealth promotion and care.  Six core skills are delineated by an eHealth literacy model referred to as the Lily model.  The Lily Model's six literacies are organized into two central types: analytic and context-specific.  Analytic type literacies are those skills that can be applied to a broad range of sources, regardless of topic or content (i.e., skills that can also be applied to shopping or researching a term paper in addition to health) whereas context-specific skills are those that are contextualized within a specific problem domain (can solely be applied to health).  The six literacies are listed below, the first three of the analytic type and the latter three of the context-specific:
 Traditional literacy
 Media literacy
 Information literacy
 Computer literacy
 Scientific literacy
 Health literacy

According to Norman (2006), both analytical and context-specific literacy skills are "required to fully engage with electronic health resources."  As the World Wide Web and technological innovations are more and more becoming a part of the healthcare environment, it is important for information technology to be properly utilized to promote health and deliver health care effectively. Furthermore, it was argued by Hayat Brainin & Neter (2017) that digital media fosters the creation of interpersonal ties, that can supplement eHealth literacy. According to Hayat Brainin & Neter (2017), individuals with low eHealth literacy who were able to recruit help when performing online activities demonstrated higher health outcomes compared to similar individuals who did not find help. Also relating to the proliferation of digital media is the fact that many individuals now can create their own 'media content' (user-generated content). This means that the boundary between "information" and "media" content, as proposed by Norman in 2006, now is increasingly blurred, creating additional challenges for health practitioners (Holmberg, 2016).

It has also been suggested that the move towards patient-centered care and the greater use of technology for self-care and self-management requires higher health literacy on the part of the patient. This has been noted in several research studies, for example among adolescent patients with obesity.

Improvement

Incorporate information through the university level 
The United States Department of Health and Human Services created a National Action Plan to Improve Health Literacy. One of the goals of the National Action Plan is to incorporate health and science information in childcare and education through the university level. The target is to educate people at an early stage; that way individuals are raised with health literacy and will have a better quality of life. The earlier an individual is exposed to health literacy skills the better for the person and the community.

Programs such as Head Start and Women, Infants, and Children (WIC) have impacted society, especially the low-income population. Head Start provides low-income children and their families early childhood education, nutrition, and health screenings. Health literacy is integrated in the program for both children and parents through the education given to the individuals. WIC serves low-income pregnant women and new mothers by supplying them with food, health care referrals, and nutrition education. Programs like these help improve the health literacy of both the parent and the child, creating a more knowledgeable community with health education.

Although programs like Head Start and WIC have been working with the health literacy of a specific population, much more can be done with the education of children and young adults. Now, more and more adolescents are getting involved with their health care. It is crucial to educate these individuals in order for them to make informed decisions.

Many schools in the country incorporate a health class in their curriculum. These classes provided an excellent opportunity to facilitate and develop health literacy in today's children and adolescents. The skills of how to read food labels, the meaning of common medical terms, the structure of the human body, and education on the most prevalent diseases in the United States should be taught in both private and public schools. This way new generations will grow with health literacy and would hopefully make knowledgeable health decisions.

Framework and potential intervention points 
The National Library of Medicine defines health literacy as:

Based on this clinical definition, health literacy gives individuals the skills that they need to both understand and effectively communicate information and concerns. Bridging that gap between literacy skills and the ability of the individual in health contexts, the Health Literacy Framework highlights the health outcomes and costs associated with health contexts including cognitive abilities, social skills, emotional state, and physical conditions such as visual and auditory contributions.

Potential Intervention Points are illustrated in reflection of the Health Literacy Framework. While these potential intervention points include interactions such as those of individuals and the education systems
that they are engaged with, their health systems, and societal factors as they relate to health literacy, these points are not components of a causal model.  The three potential intervention points are culture and society, the health system, and the education system. Health outcomes and costs are the products of the health literacy developed during diversity of exposure to these three potential intervention points.

Referring to shared ideas, meanings, and values that influence an individual's beliefs and attitudes, cultural and societal influences are a significant intervention point for health literacy development. As interactions with healthcare systems often first occur at the family level, deeply rooted beliefs and values can shape the significance of the experience. Included components that reflect the development of health literacy both culturally and societally are native language, socioeconomic status, gender, race, and ethnicity, as well as mass media exposure. These are pathways to understanding American life paralleling conquests for a health-literate America.

The health system is an intervention point in the Health Literacy Framework. For the purposes of this framework, health literacy refers to an individual's interaction with people performing health-related activities in settings such as hospitals, clinics, physician's offices, home health care, public health agencies, and insurers.

In the United States, the education system consists of K–12 curricula. In addition to this standard educational setting, adult education programs are also environments in which individuals can develop traditional literacy skills founded in comprehension and real-world application of knowledge via reading and writing.  Tools for educational development provided by these systems impact an individual's capacity to obtain specific knowledge regarding health. Reflecting components of traditional literacy such as cultural and conceptual knowledge, oral literacy (listening and speaking,) print literacy (reading and writing,) and numeracy, education systems are also potential intervention points for health literacy development.

Development of a health literacy program 
A successful health literacy program will have many goals that all work together to improve health literacy. Many people assume these goals should communicate health information to the general public; however, in order to be successful, the goals should not only communicate with people but also take into account social and environmental factors that influence lifestyle choices. A good example of this is the movement to end smoking. When a health literacy program is put into place where only the negative side effects of smoking are told to the general public it is doomed to fail. However, when there is a larger program put in – one that includes strategies outlining how to quit smoking, raises tobacco prices, reduces access to tobacco by minors, and reflects the social unacceptability of smoking – it will be much more effective.

The U.S. Department of Health and Human Services suggests a National Action Plan to implement a comprehensive Health Literacy Program. They include seven goals:
 Develop and disseminate health and safety information that is accurate, accessible, and actionable
 Promote changes in the health care system that improve health information, communication, informed decision making, and access to health services
 Incorporate accurate, standards-based, and developmentally appropriate health and science information and curricula in child care and education through the university level
 Support and expand local efforts to provide adult education, English language instruction, and culturally and linguistically appropriate health information services in the community
 Build partnerships, develop guidance, and change policies
 Increase basic research and the development, implementation, and evaluation of practices and interventions to improve health literacy
 Increase the dissemination and use of evidence-based health literacy practices and interventions
These goals should be taken into account when implementing a health literacy program.

There are also goals for the outcomes of a Health Literacy Program.

Health-related goals:
 Promoting and protect health and prevent disease
 Understand, interpret, and analyze health information
 Apply health information over a variety of life events and situations
 Navigate the healthcare system 
 Actively participate in encounters with healthcare professionals and workers
 Understand and give consent
 Understand and advocate for rights

In the creation of a program aimed to improve health literacy, it is also important to ensure that all parties involved in health contexts are on the same page. To do this, programs may choose to include the training of case managers, health advocates, and even doctors and nurses. Due to the common overestimations of health literacy levels of patients, the education of health literacy topics and training in the identification of low health literacy in patients may be able to create significant positive change in the understanding of health messages. The Health Belief Model has been used in the training of health professionals in order to share insight on the knowledge that it has been shown to most likely change health perceptions and behaviors of their patients. The use of the health belief model can provide basis for which patient health literacy may grow. The training of health workers may be seen as a "work around intervention" but is still a viable option and opportunity for mediating the negative outcomes of low health literacy. Effective health literacy programs are created with cultural competency, and individuals working within health institutions can support individuals with low health literacy by being culturally competent themselves.

In working to improve the health literacy of individuals, a multitude of approaches may be taken. Systematic reviews of studied interventions reveal that one works to improve health literacy in one patient may not work for another patient. In fact, some interventions were found to worse health literacy in individuals. Nonetheless, studies have illuminated general approaches that help individuals understand health messages. A review of 26 studies concluded that "intensive mixed-strategy interventions focusing on self-management" and "theory basis, pilot testing, emphasis on skill building, and delivery by a health professional" do aid in increasing levels of health literacy among patients. Another study revealed that programs aimed at targeting more than one behavior through increased health literacy are no less successful than programs with a single focus. The importance of dignity and respect is emphasized when creating programs for increasing health literacy of vulnerable individuals. In intervention programs created for homeless individuals in specific, it has been found that "successful intervention programs use aggressive outreach to bring comprehensive social and health services to sites where homeless people congregate and allow clients to set the limits and pace of engagement". A social justice model is recommended for homeless individuals which is based on shared support of the community and their health literacy needs by those who provide services for this underserved group as well as the professionals who create and implement health literacy interventions.

Role of libraries in health literacy
Libraries have increasingly recognized that they can play a role in health literacy since the 2000s, influenced by the Medical Library Association.  Library initiatives have included running education programs, fostering partnerships with health organizations, and using outreach efforts. Pan American Health Organization contributed greatly through their libraries network. Various medical library associations have made an effort to introduce health literacy programs by attempting to define the concept to include the librarian's role as including a set of abilities needed to recognize a health information need, identify likely information sources and use them to retrieve relevant information, and assess the quality of the information and its applicability to a specific health situation. The Network of the National Library of Medicine (NNLM) twice yearly hosts the #citeNLM Wikipedia Edit-a-thon initiative to "improve the credibility and content of medical and health-related articles on Wikipedia by adding citations and information from National Library of Medicine (NLM) sources."

Alternative approaches
A study published in the American Journal of Obstetrics and Gynecology in 2018 suggested an alternative method of addressing health literacy. This alternative method is the use of "culturally-related/accepted" music and singing amongst low-literacy populations. In the example of this study, the music was shown to increase health literacy with regards to maternal health, and more specifically, antenatal care.

See also
 Adult education
  (Health numeracy)
 Health promotion
 Information literacies
 Mental health literacy
 mHealth
 
 Patient safety

Citations

Sources

Rudd, R., Moeykens, B. Colton, TC. (1999) Health and literacy: A review of medical and public health literature. In J. Comings, B. Garners, & C. Smith, eds. Annual Review of Adult Learning and Literacy, Volume I. New York, NY: Jossey-Bass.

Zarcadoolas, C., Pleasant, A., & Greer, D. (2006). Advancing health literacy: A framework for understanding and action. Jossey-Bass: San Francisco, CA.

External links
Teaching Patients with Low Literacy Skills by Doak, Doak, and Root free download of entire book 
Health literacy course and materials based at Harvard University led by Rima Rudd
Health Literacy Discussion List
Health and Literacy Special Collection 
"A Selection of Health Literacy Articles and Research" published by Partnership for Clear Health Communication
Health Literacy Consulting. Includes the full-text of many health literacy articles as well as links to numerous resources.
 Using social media for improving health literacy. In: THE SOLID FACTS - Health Literacy: Enabling healthier decisions in the 21st century. Copenhagen, Denmark: World Health Organization Regional Office for Europe, due Oct 2012 (in press)
 Health information: are you getting your message across?

Health care
Literacy
Patient safety
Literacy